A list of agencies and departments of the Government of Pakistan.

Cabinet Secretariat

 Airports Security Force
 Akthar Hameed Khan National Centre for Rural Development 
 Civil Aviation Authority
 Department of Communications Security 
 Department of Stationery and Forms 
 Federal Employees Benevolent and Group Insurance Fund 
 Federal Public Service Commission
 Civil Services Academy
 Management Services Wing 
 National Archives of Pakistan
 National School of Public Policy
 Pakistan Academy for Rural Development 
 Pakistan Bait-ul-Mal
 Pakistan International Airlines Corporation
 Pakistan Meteorological Department
 National Agromet Centre 
 Pakistan Tourism Development Corporation
 Printing Corporation of Pakistan
 Public Procurement Regulatory Authority
 Secretariat Training Institute 
 Staff Welfare Organization

Ministry of Climate Change

 Global Change Impact Studies Centre 
 National Disaster Management Authority
 National Institute of Disaster Management
 Pakistan Environmental Protection Agency
 Zoological Survey Department

Ministry of Commerce and Textile Industry
Division of Commerce, and Division of Textile Industry
 Directorate General of Trade Organizations 
 Export Development Fund
 Intellectual Property Organisation of Pakistan
 National Insurance Company 
 National Tariff Commission 
 National Textile University 
 Pakistan Cotton Standards Institute 
 Pakistan Institute of Development Economics
 Pakistan Horticulture Development and Export Company
 Pakistan Institute of Fashion and Design
 Pakistan Reinsurance Company Limited 
 Pakistan Institute of Trade and Development
 State Life Insurance Corporation of Pakistan
 Textile Commissioner's Organization 
 Trade Development Authority of Pakistan
 Trade Dispute Resolution Organization 
 Trading Corporation of Pakistan

Ministry of Communications

 Construction Technology Training Institute 
 National Highway Authority
 National Highways and Motorway Police
 National Transport Research Centre

Ministry of Defence

 Pakistan Armed Forces
 Inter-Services Public Relations
 Inter Services Selection Board
 Military Lands and Cantonments Department
 National Defence University
 Institute for Strategic Studies, Research and Analysis
 Pakistan Air Force
 Air Intelligence
 Pakistan Air Force Academy
 Pakistan Army
 Defence Housing Authority
 Frontier Works Organization
 Military Intelligence
 National Guard
 Pakistan Military Academy
 Pakistan Navy
 Naval Intelligence
 Pakistan Marines
 Pakistan Naval Academy
 Pakistan Maritime Security Agency
 Pakistan Military Accounts Department
 Survey of Pakistan

Ministry of Defence Production

 Armament Research and Development Establishment
 Defence Export Promotion Organization
 Directorate General of Defence Purchase 
 Directorate General of Munitions Production
 Defence Science and Technology Organization
 Heavy Industries Taxila 
 Institute of Optronics
 Karachi Shipyard and Engineering Works
 Khan Research Laboratories 
 Military Vehicles Research and Development Establishment
 National Engineering and Scientific Commission 
 Air Weapons Complex 
 National Development Complex
 National Radio Telecommunications Corporation 
 Pakistan Aeronautical Complex
 Pakistan Ordnance Factories
 Wah Metallurgical Laboratory

Ministry of Energy

 Alternative Energy Development Board
 Central Power Purchasing Agency 
 Geological Survey of Pakistan
 Government Holdings Private Limited 
 Hydrocarbon Development Institute of Pakistan 
 Inter-State Gas Systems Limited 
 Lakhara Coal Development Company  
 National Energy Conservation Centre
 National Electric Power Regulatory Authority
 National Engineering Services Pakistan
 National Transmission and Despatch Company
 Oil and Gas Development Company
 Oil and Gas Regulatory Authority
 Pak-Arab Refinery Company
 Pakistan LNG Limited
 Pakistan LNG Terminals Limited 
 Pakistan Mineral Development Corporation
 Pakistan Petroleum
 Pakistan State Oil
 Power Information Technology Company
 Private Power and Infrastructure Board
 Saindak Metals Limited 
 Sui Northern Gas Pipelines Limited
 Sui Southern Gas Company
 Power Distribution Companies (DISCOS)

Ministry of Federal Education and Professional Training

 Academy of Educational Planning and Management 
 Directorate General of Special Education and Social Welfare
 Federal Board of Intermediate and Secondary Education
 Federal Directorate of Education
 Higher Education Commission of Pakistan
 National Commission for Human Development
 Pakistan Human Development Fund
 National Education Assessment System
 National Education Foundation 
 National Institute of Science and Technical Education
 National Training Bureau
 National Vocational and Technical Training Commission
 Pakistan Manpower Institute
 Pakistan National Commission for UNESCO 
 Private Educational Institution Regulatory Authority

Ministry of Finance, Revenue and Economic Affairs

 Accountant General Pakistan Revenues 
 Auditor General of Pakistan
 Central Directorate of National Savings 
 Competition Commission of Pakistan
 Controller General of Accounts
 Federal Board of Revenue
 Directorate General of Intelligence and Investigation
 Financial Monitoring Unit
 Securities and Exchange Commission of Pakistan

Ministry of Foreign Affairs

 Foreign Service of Pakistan
 Foreign Service Academy
 Institute of Strategic Studies Islamabad
 Strategic Export Control Division

Ministry of Housing and Works

 Estate Office 
 Federal Government Employees Housing Authority
 PHA Foundation
 Public Works Department

Ministry of Human Rights

 National Commission for Child Welfare and Development
 National Commission for Human Rights 
 National Commission on the Status of Women
  National Commission on the Rights of Child

Ministry of Industries and Production

 ENAR Petrotech Services 
 Engineering Development Board 
 Export Processing Zone Authority 
 Heavy Electrical Complex 
 National Fertilizer Corporation
 National Fertilizer Marketing Limited 
 National Industrial Parks Development and Management Company 
 National Productivity Organization
 Pakistan Engineering Company 
 Pakistan Gems and Jewellery Development Company
 Pakistan Hunting and Sporting Arms Development Company
 Pakistan Industrial Development Corporation
 Pakistan Industrial Technical Assistance Centre
 Pakistan Institute of Management 
 Pakistan Machine Tool Factory 
 Pakistan Steel Mills
 Small and Medium Enterprise Development Authority
 Pakistan Stone Development Company 
 Technology Upgradation and Skill Development Company 
 Utility Stores Corporation

Ministry of Information Technology and Telecommunication

 Ignite National Technology Fund
 National Information Technology Board
 National Telecommunication Corporation
 Pakistan Software Export Board
 Pakistan Telecommunication Authority
 Pakistan Telecommunications Company Limited
 Special Communications Organization
 Virtual University of Pakistan

Ministry of Information, Broadcasting and National Heritage

 Aiwan-e-Iqbal
 Associated Press of Pakistan
 Central Board of Film Censors
 Department of Archeology and Museums
 Directorate of Electronic Media and Publication 
 Federal Land Commission
 Institute of Regional Studies
 Iqbal Academy
 National Book Foundation 
 National Institute of Folk and Traditional Heritage
 National Language Promotion Department
 National Museum of Pakistan
 Pakistan Academy of Letters
 Pakistan Broadcasting Corporation 
 Pakistan Electronic Media Regulatory Authority
 Pakistan National Council of the Arts
 Pakistan Television Corporation 
 PTV Academy
 Press Council of Pakistan
 Quaid-e-Azam Academy
 Quaid-e-Azam Mazar Management Board

Ministry of Inter-Provincial Coordination

 Council of Common Interests
 Islamabad Wildlife Management Board
 National Academy of Performing Arts
 Pakistan Cricket Board
 Pakistan Sports Board
 Pakistan Veterinary Medical Council

Ministry of Interior

 Capital Development Authority 
 Directorate General of Civil Defence
 Civil Defence Academy
 National Institute of Fire Technology
 Directorate General of Immigration and Passports
 Federal Investigation Agency
 National Response Centre for Cyber Crime
 Civil Armed Forces
 Frontier Constabulary
 Frontier Corps Balochistan (North)
 Frontier Corps Balochistan (South)
 Frontier Corps Khyber Pakhtunkhwa (North)
 Frontier Corps Khyber Pakhtunkhwa (South)
 Punjab Rangers
 Sindh Rangers
 Gilgit-Baltistan Scouts
 Pakistan Coast Guards
 Intelligence Bureau
 National Academy for Prisons Administration
 National Counter Terrorism Authority
 National Crises Management Cell
 National Database and Registration Authority
 National Forensic Science Agency
 National Intelligence Directorate
 National Police Bureau

Ministry of Kashmir Affairs and Gilgit-Baltistan

 Jammu and Kashmir Refugees Rehabilitation Organization
 Northern Areas Transport Corporation
 Directorate of Health Service, AJK
 Directorate of Health Service, Gilgit-Baltistan
 Jammu and Kashmir State Property, Lahore

Ministry of Law and Justice

 Law and Justice Commission of Pakistan

Ministry of Maritime Affairs

 Government Shipping Office
 Gwadar Port Authority
 Karachi Port Trust
 Marine Fisheries Department
 Mercantile Marine Department
 Pakistan Marine Academy
 Pakistan National Shipping Corporation
 Port Qasim Authority

Ministry of Narcotics Control

 Anti-Narcotics Force

Ministry of National Food Security and Research

 Animal Quarantine Department
 Department of Plant Protection
 Fisheries Development Board
 Livestock and Dairy Development Board 
 National Veterinary Lab
 Pakistan Agricultural Research Council
 National Agricultural Research Centre
 Pakistan Agricultural Storage and Services Corporation
 Pakistan Oilseed Development Board

Ministry of National Health Services Regulation and Coordination

 College of Physicians and Surgeons Pakistan
 Drug Regulatory Authority of Pakistan
 Human Organ Transplant Authority
 National Institute of Health
 National Institute of Population Studies
 Pakistan Institute of Medical Sciences
 Pakistan Medical and Dental Council
 Pakistan Health Research Council
 Pakistan Nursing Council
 Pharmacy Council of Pakistan

Ministry of Overseas Pakistanis and Human Resource Development

 Bureau of Emigration and Overseas Employment
 Directorate of Workers Education 
 Employees Old-Age Benefits Institution
 National Industrial Relations Commission
 Overseas Employment Corporation 
 Overseas Pakistanis Foundation
 Workers Welfare Fund

Ministry of Parliamentary Affairs
 National Assembly
 Senate

Ministry of Planning and Development

 Planning Commission of Pakistan
 National Fertilizer Development Centre
 Pakistan Institute of Development Economics
 Pakistan Planning and Management Institute

Ministry of Postal Services
 Pakistan Post

Ministry of Privatisation

 Privatisation Commission

Ministry of Railways

 Pakistan Railways
 Pakistan Railways Academy
 Pakistan Railways Police

Ministry of Religious Affairs and Inter-faith Harmony
 Council of Islamic Ideology
 Evacuee Trust Property Board
 Pakistan Sikh Gurdwara Prabandhak Committee
 Madrassah Education Board

Ministry of Science and Technology

 Council for Work and Housing Research
 National Institute of Electronics
 National Institute of Oceanography
 Pakistan Antarctic Programme
 National University of Sciences and Technology
 Pakistan Council for Renewable Energy Technologies
 Pakistan Council of Research in Water Resources
 Pakistan Council for Science and Technology
 National Commission for Science and Technology
 Pakistan Council of Scientific and Industrial Research
 Pakistan Engineering Council
 Pakistan National Accreditation Council
 Pakistan Science Foundation
 Pakistan Museum of Natural History
 Pakistan Scientific and Technological Information Centre
 Pakistan Standards and Quality Control Authority

Ministry of States and Frontier Regions
 Chief Commissionerate for Afghan Refugees

Ministry of Statistics

 Pakistan Bureau of Statistics now shifted under ministry of planning and development

Ministry of Water Resources

 Federal Flood Commission
 Indus River System Authority
 Pakistan Commissioner for Indus Waters
 Water and Power Development Authority

Other

 Abdus Salam Centre for Physics
 Centre for Earthquake Studies
 Attorney-General for Pakistan
 Board of Investment
 Cabinet Committee on National Security
 Earthquake Reconstruction and Rehabilitation Authority
 Economic Coordination Committee
 Election Commission of Pakistan
 Export Import Bank of Pakistan 
 Federal Ombudsman of Pakistan 
 Federal Judicial Academy
 Frequency Allocation Board
 Gazette of Pakistan
 Institute of Bankers Pakistan
 Institute of Chartered Accountants of Pakistan
 Institute of Cost and Management Accountants of Pakistan
 Inter-Services Intelligence
Islamabad Capital Territory Administration
 Islamabad Police
 Islamabad Traffic Police
 National Accountability Bureau
 National Bioethics Committee 
 National Command Authority
 Centre of Excellence for Nuclear Security
 Strategic Plans Division Force
 National Commission for Government Reforms 
 National Library of Pakistan
 National Logistics Cell
 National Police Academy of Pakistan
 National Security Council
 Pakistan Atomic Energy Commission
 CHASNUPP Centre for Nuclear Training
 KANUPP Institute of Nuclear Power Engineering
 National Institute for Biotechnology and Genetic Engineering
 Nuclear Institute for Agriculture and Biology
 Nuclear Institute for Food and Agriculture
 Pakistan Institute of Nuclear Science and Technology
 Pakistan Bar Council 
 Pakistan Council for Architects and Town Planners
 Pakistan Customs
 Pakistan Infrastructure Bank
 Pakistan Institute for Parliamentary Services
 Pakistan Institute of Public Finance Accountants
 Pakistan Nuclear Regulatory Authority
 Pakistan Oilfields
 Public Private Partnership Authority
 Ruet-e-Hilal Committee
 Space and Upper Atmosphere Research Commission of Pakistan
 Institute of Space and Planetary Astrophysics
 KU Observatory
 Institute of Space Technology
 Pakistan Mission Control Centre
 Satellite Ground Station
 Sonmiani Spaceport
 Tilla Satellite Launch Centre
 State Bank of Pakistan
 National Institute of Banking and Finance
 Pakistan Mint
 Zarai Taraqiati Bank Limited

References

External links
 The Official Web Gateway to Pakistan
 Prime Minister's Office, Islamabad, Pakistan

Executive branch of the government of Pakistan
Pakistan
Federal